Gerald Barry was a British stage and film actor. He also co-directed the 1936 film The Last Waltz with Leo Mittler.

Selected filmography
 The Unholy Night (1929)
 His Glorious Night (1929)
 Girl of the Port (1930)
 Son of India (1931)
 What Price Hollywood? (1932)
 Channel Crossing (1933)
 The Lad (1935)
 The Right Age to Marry (1935)
 The Night of the Party (1935)
 Once in a New Moon (1935)
 The Improper Duchess (1936)
 Cheer Up (1936)
 The Last Waltz (1936)
 The Crimes of Stephen Hawke (1936)
 Everything Is Rhythm (1936)
 Tropical Trouble (1936)
 Radio Lover (1936)
 Everything in Life (1936)
 La dernière valse (1936)
 It's You I Want (1936)
 The Schooner Gang (1937)
 Knights for a Day (1937)

References

Bibliography
 Goble, Alan. The Complete Index to Literary Sources in Film. Walter de Gruyter, 1999.

External links

Year of birth unknown
Year of death unknown
British male film actors
British male stage actors